Carmine Maria Pariante FRCPsych (born March 1966) is professor of biological psychiatry at the Institute of Psychiatry at King's College, London, and consultant perinatal psychiatrist at the South London and Maudsley NHS Trust. He also works as the lead for the Affective Disorders and Interface with Medicine theme at the National Institute for Health and Care Research (NIHR) Maudsley Biomedical Research Centre (BRC).

He received his PhD from the University of London and his MD from Gemelli University, Rome.

Pariante's work specialises in the role of stress in the pathogenesis of mental disorders and in the response to psychotropic drugs. He focuses on depression and fatigue, particularly with respect to the perinatal period and in those suffering from medical disorders.

In 2012, he was named Academic Psychiatrist of the Year by the Royal College of Psychiatrists.

References

External links 
https://www.researchgate.net/profile/Carmine_Pariante
What causes depression? by Prof Carmine Pariante.

Living people
Academics of King's College London
1966 births
Italian psychiatrists
NIHR Senior Investigators
Fellows of the Royal College of Psychiatrists
Alumni of the University of London